Castle Caereinion railway station is a railway station on the  narrow gauge Welshpool and Llanfair Light Railway in Mid Wales. The station was opened on 6 April 1903.

The station was an important intermediate stop and had a signal box that still survives. The level crossing over the B4385 has been automated since 2015. The Great Western Railway withdrew passenger services on 9 February 1931. and the line closed completely on 3 November 1956. By 1963 the line had a passenger service restored by the Welshpool and Llanfair Railway. The station officially reopened on 6 April 1963, however due to damage caused by floods to the Banwy Bridge it was closed between 28 September 1964 and 14 August 1965.

Two platforms are present and a passing loop that sees occasional use. The main platform is raised whilst the other is at ground level.

References 
Notes

Sources

 
 Rushton, Gordon (2015). The Welshpool & Llanfair Railway  Travellers's Guide. Llanfair Caereinion : Welshpool & Llanfair Railway.

External links
 Video footage of Castle Caereinion station
 3 minutes from Welshpool to Llanfair Caereinion

Welshpool and Llanfair Light Railway
Heritage railway stations in Powys
Former Cambrian Railway stations
Railway stations in Great Britain opened in 1903
Railway stations in Great Britain closed in 1931
Railway stations in Great Britain opened in 1963